Ectocarpus is a genus of filamentous brown alga that is a model organism for the genomics of multicellularity. Among possible model organisms in the brown algae, Ectocarpus was selected for the relatively small size of its mature thallus and the speed with which it completes its life cycle. The type species for the genus is Ectocarpus siliculosus (Dillwyn) Lyngbye. The life history is an isomorphic to slightly kiheteromorphic alternation of generations, but asexual strains also exist.

Taxonomy and Nomenclature 
In 1809, Dillwyn described Ectocarpus as another algae known as Conferva siliculosa basing from collected specimens by W.J. Hooker from Norfolk and East Sussex. In 1819, Lyngbye subsequently described Ectocarpus using a specimen from Denmark, citing C. siliculosa Dilwyn as its basionym. These brown algae are known members of heterokonts, which includes diatoms and oomycetes. Ectocarpales is known to be primitive from a phylogenetic standpoint, emerging from a group of brown algae that has recently evolved together with the order Laminariales, a group consisting of kelp species. Phylogenetic analyses are underway to resolve a certain complexity within the genus in order to confirm different species.

Morphology 
Studies on morphology have been limited for Ectocarpus as only two species in the genera (E. siliculosa and E. fasciculatus) are well-described based on morphology and genetic sequence.

In general, Ectocarpus is described to be a filamentous algae that can grow up to 30 cm. Cultured specimens in the laboratory tend to be fertile as early as 1–3 cm in length. In unialgal cultures, Ectocarpus are described to have a branched appearance, in contrast, axenic cultures show Ectocarpus having a small ball-shaped appearance. E. siliculosus functions as a model organism in the genus, used as a basis for molecular markers that can aid in understanding genetic polymorphism among species and between life cycles across different locations in the world.

Distribution 
Ectocarpus can be found across the globe, in temperate shorelines growing as epiphytes on other flora (e.g. seagrass, other alga) or on rocky substrates. While commonly attached to a substrate, thalli of Ectocarpus may also survive while floating. Ectocarpus are also commonly found as epiphytes on marine macroflora rather than epilithic, although studies have been limited in evaluating their hosts. On the other hand, E. fasciculatus is known as an endophyte of Laminaria digitata, but no study has documented how it bypasses the kelp's defense.  E. crouniorium are found in the intertidal zone while E. siliculosus and E. fasciculatus can be found in mid-intertidal and subtidal zones, respectively.

Ecology 
Ectocarpus thalli tend to shelter several marine invertebrates (e.g. crustaceans and nematodes) and some protists, which are either feeding on its thallus or reproductive cells, however, these have not been documented previously.  Few have studied the genus' ecology, however, previous studies have shown that temperature affects the life cycle of a few strains which may suggest genetic differences among Ectocarpus species.

Life History 
Ectocarpus has a haplo-diploid life cycle having both sporophyte and gametophyte stages, which can complete its whole life cycle within 3 months in the laboratory. Diploid sporophytes give rise to haploid meiospores which will then produce a haploid gametophyte generation. These gametophytes are dioecious, which are either male or female wherein their fusion would produce diploid zygotes, restarting the sporophyte stage. Parthenogenesis may also occur when one gamete does not find the opposite, producing a sporophyte.

Cultivation and Exploitation 
A protocol has been established in culturing Ectocarpus in the laboratory using sporophyte filament as a starter, collected and maintained as a strain. Ectocarpus are able to grow in artificial seawater although a standard medium that can be used is a Provasoli-enriched seawater (PES). Standard laboratory conditions also include 13 degrees Celsius as temperature under 12h light:dark cycle with irradiance at 20 µmol photons m−2 s−1 using fluorescent lights.

Chemical Composition 
Iodide originating from seawater can be accumulated in high concentrations by several brown algae. Among Ectocarpus, enzymes have been identified to be involved iodine emission including some dehalogenases and haloalkane dehalogenases. These enzymes may also aid in defending Ectocarpus as an epiphyte, against halogenated defenses of its host.

Utilization and Management 
Ectocarpus may be vulnerable to an array of pathogens and parasites. In addition, environmental stress caused by temperature, light, and salinity changes. The transcriptome of Ectocarpus is primarily affected, where gene expression is altered in number despite low to mild stress. Further studies are needed to confirm stress-induced changes in its genes, since there may be other unknown mechanisms it may affect.

List of species
Some currently accepted species of Ectocarpus include:

Ectocarpus acanthophorus Kützing
Ectocarpus acutoramulis Noda
Ectocarpus acutus Setchell & N.L.Gardner
Ectocarpus adriaticus Ercegovic
Ectocarpus affinis Setchell & N.L.Gardner
Ectocarpus aleuticus Kützing
Ectocarpus auratus Bory de Saint-Vincentex Kützing
Ectocarpus balakrishnanii V.Krishnamurthy
Ectocarpus barbadensis Kuckuck
Ectocarpus berteroanus Montagne
Ectocarpus bombycinus Kützing
Ectocarpus borealis (Kjellman) Kjellman
Ectocarpus bracchiolus Lindauer
Ectocarpus brachiatus (Smith) S.F.Gray
Ectocarpus brevicellularis Noda
Ectocarpus caliacrae Celan
Ectocarpus capensis Kützing
Ectocarpus caspicus Henckel
Ectocarpus chantransioides Setchell & N.L.Gardner
Ectocarpus chapmanii Lindauer
Ectocarpus chnoosporae Børgesen
Ectocarpus cladosiphonae Noda
Ectocarpus clavifer J.Agardh
Ectocarpus commensalis Setchell & N.L.Gardner
Ectocarpus commixtus Noda
Ectocarpus confusiphyllus Noda
Ectocarpus congregatus Zanardini
Ectocarpus constanciae Hariot
Ectocarpus corticulatus De A.Saunders
Ectocarpus crouanii Thuret
Ectocarpus crouaniorum Thuret
Ectocarpus cryptophilus Børgesen
Ectocarpus cymosus Zanardini
Ectocarpus cystophylloides Noda
Ectocarpus dellowianus Lindauer
Ectocarpus denudatus P.L.Crouan & H.M.Crouan
Ectocarpus dictyoptericola Noda
Ectocarpus distortus Carmichael
Ectocarpus divergens Kornmann
Ectocarpus ensenadanus N.L.Gardner
Ectocarpus erectus Kützing
Ectocarpus exiguus Skottsberg
Ectocarpus exilis Zanardini
Ectocarpus falklandicus Skottsberg
Ectocarpus fasciculatus Harvey (syn: Ectocarpus Landsburgii Harvey; named after the rev. David Landsborough)
Ectocarpus fenestroides P.L.Crouan & H.M.Crouan
Ectocarpus flagelliferus Setchell & N.L.Gardner
Ectocarpus flagelliformis Kützing
Ectocarpus fructuosus  Setchell & N.L.Gardner
Ectocarpus fulvescens  Schousboe ex Thuret
Ectocarpus fungiformis  Oltmanns
Ectocarpus fusiformis  Nagai
Ectocarpus giraudiae  J.Agardh ex William M. Wilson
Ectocarpus glaziovii Zeller
Ectocarpus gonodioides  Setchell & N.L.Gardner
Ectocarpus hamulosus  Harvey & J.W.Bailey
Ectocarpus hancockii E.Y.Dawson
Ectocarpus heterocarpus  P.L.Crouan & H.M.Crouan
Ectocarpus hornericola  Noda
Ectocarpus humilis  Kützing
Ectocarpus intermedius Kützing
Ectocarpus isopodicola  E.Y.Dawson
Ectocarpus kellneri  Meneghini
Ectocarpus kjellmanioides  Noda
Ectocarpus laminariae  Noda
Ectocarpus laurenciae  Yamada
Ectocarpus lepasicola  Noda
Ectocarpus macrocarpus Harvey
Ectocarpus macrocarpus P.L.Crouan & H.M.Crouan
Ectocarpus minor  Noda
Ectocarpus minutissimus  Skottsberg & Levring
Ectocarpus minutulus  Montagne
Ectocarpus mitchellioides  Noda
Ectocarpus monzensis  Noda & Konno
Ectocarpus multifurcus  Zanardini
Ectocarpus myurus  Zanardini
Ectocarpus natans  Zanardini
Ectocarpus niigatensis  Noda
Ectocarpus nitens  De Notaris
Ectocarpus oblongatus  Noda
Ectocarpus obovatus  Foslie
Ectocarpus obtusocarpus  P.L.Crouan & H.M.Crouan
Ectocarpus obtusus  Noda
Ectocarpus parvulus  Kützing
Ectocarpus pectenis  Ercegović
Ectocarpus penicillatus  (C.Agardh) Kjellman
Ectocarpus plasticola  Noda
Ectocarpus plumosus  Noda
Ectocarpus polysiphoniae  Noda
Ectocarpus pumilus  Zanardini
Ectocarpus radicans  Zanardini
Ectocarpus rallsiae Vickers
Ectocarpus ramentaceus  Zanardini
Ectocarpus rotundatoapicalis  Noda & Honda
Ectocarpus rudis  Zanardini
Ectocarpus rufulus  Kützing
Ectocarpus rufus  (Roth) C.Agardh
Ectocarpus sadoensis  Noda
Ectocarpus sargassicaulinus  Noda
Ectocarpus sargassiphyllus  Noda
Ectocarpus saxatilis  Zanardini
Ectocarpus scytosiphonae  Noda
Ectocarpus shiiyaensis Noda
Ectocarpus shimokitaensis  Ohta
Ectocarpus siliculosus  (Dillwyn) Lyngbye
Ectocarpus simpliciusculus  C.Agardh
Ectocarpus simulans  Setchell & N.L.Gardner
Ectocarpus sonorensis  E.Y.Dawson
Ectocarpus sphaericus  Ohta
Ectocarpus strigosus  Zanardini
Ectocarpus tamarinii Børgesen
Ectocarpus taoniae  Setchell & N.L.Gardner
Ectocarpus tappiensis  Ohta
Ectocarpus tasshaensis Noda
Ectocarpus trichophorus  H.Gran
Ectocarpus tsugaruensis  Ohta
Ectocarpus variabilis  Vickers
Ectocarpus venetus  Kützing
Ectocarpus vungtauensis  P.H. Hô
Ectocarpus yezoensis  Yamada & Tanaka
Ectocarpus zonariae  W.R.Taylor
Ectocarpus zosterae  Noda & Ohta

References

Further reading

External links 
 Ectocarpus on algaebase.org

Ectocarpales
Brown algae genera